Maureen Frances O'Connor (born July 14, 1946) is an American Democratic politician from California. She was the 31st mayor of San Diego from 1986 to 1992, the first woman to serve in that position. In 2013, federal prosecutors charged her with money laundering, but deferred prosecution based on her agreement to pay back the funds involved. The charges were formally dismissed by Judge David Bartick on February 24, 2015.

Early life
Maureen O'Connor was born in 1946 in San Diego, California. She was one of 13 children; her parents were Jerome O'Connor, formerly a local boxer known as "Kid Jerome" who later owned several liquor stores in San Diego, and Frances Mary O'Connor. She and her twin sister Mavourneen ("Mo") were avid athletes in their youth—she a swimmer and her sister a tennis player. All seven O'Connor daughters competed as precision swimmers, together winning more than 1000 team and individual medals and trophies. Maureen graduated from San Diego State University in 1970. After graduation, O'Connor was a physical education teacher and counselor for Rosary High School for a few years.

Political career
Although shy, she got her start in politics after being treated rudely at City Hall. In 1971 she ran for and was elected to the San Diego City Council and served to 1979. O'Connor  was commissioner for the Port of San Diego from 1980–1985.

O'Connor  met her future husband Robert O. Peterson, founder of the Jack in the Box fast food chain, while first running for city council, and were married in 1977 in Europe. Although a Republican, he supported her in her political campaigns. He filed for divorce in 1985 but they soon reconciled. Peterson died in 1994. They had no children.

In 1983 she ran unsuccessfully for mayor against Roger Hedgecock, but won in 1985 after Hedgecock resigned under a cloud of scandal. O'Connor was San Diego's first female mayor, and the first Democrat to hold the office since 1971.  She served two terms. O'Connor once spent a few nights incognito with the homeless to see first-hand how they were doing. A nun recognized her and whispered to her that "if you want to conceal your identity, you should remember that homeless women don't read the financial pages."

Although known affectionally as "Mayor Mo" by her supporters, her critics included members of the city council. Former councilman (and future city mayor) Bob Filner accused her of avoiding debate and "bullying people, one issue at a time."
Others charged that she avoided difficult issues and concentrated on her "'populist' appeal that [is] . . . 'a mile wide and an inch deep.'"

In 2000 she joined consumer activists in decrying the notoriously destructive effects of utility deregulation on California. "This is turning into a nightmare for San Diego," O'Connor said. "It [deregulation] didn't work, unfortunately. . .  Let's admit it, fix it and save San Diego."

O'Connor lives in San Diego.

In 1987 she was the first Mayor of San Diego to march in the Gay Pride Parade alongside the mother of an AIDS patient. She was fulfilling a campaign promise to the LGBT community. She was cheered and booed. She said she was not condoning or condemning anyone, just showing support.

2013 money laundering charges

In February 2013 O'Connor was charged in federal court with money laundering. Under an agreement with prosecutors, prosecution was deferred, contingent on her repaying $2 million which she allegedly took from a nonprofit foundation she managed, the R. P. Foundation, created by her late husband Robert O. Peterson. The fund is reported to be virtually defunct, its sole assets being $2 million owed to it by unspecified foundation insiders. Prosecutors said her gambling activity exceeded $1 billion over the period 2000–2008, with net losses of around $13 million, leaving her "destitute".

O'Connor attributed a brain tumor, which she had surgery for in 2011, as the reason for her addiction to gambling.

Quotes
I came in as a maverick, and I will go out as a maverick.

The mayor and the council in the past decade have decided to support the dessert menu: pay for ballparks, the Republican convention, anything that supports the chamber of commerce and the big downtown corporate leaders. They have neglected the basics: potholes in the streets, clean bay, clean ocean, affordable housing. When I left office there was an AAA bond rating, money in the bank. . . . [later] city government underfunded the pension fund to pay for this dessert menu.

External links
 San Diego Union-Tribune article written by O'Connor, August 2005

References

 https://www.latimes.com/archives/la-xpm-1987-06-14-me-7262-story.html

Living people
Mayors of San Diego
San Diego City Council members
Women city councillors in California
1946 births
Women mayors of places in California
San Diego State University alumni
California Democrats
20th-century American politicians
20th-century American women politicians
American twins